Zheng Dongmei (born 23 December 1967) is a Chinese former basketball player who competed in the 1992 Summer Olympics and in the 1996 Summer Olympics.

References

1967 births
Living people
Chinese women's basketball players
Basketball players from Hebei
Olympic basketball players of China
Olympic medalists in basketball
Olympic silver medalists for China
Medalists at the 1992 Summer Olympics
Basketball players at the 1992 Summer Olympics
Basketball players at the 1996 Summer Olympics
Asian Games medalists in basketball
Basketball players at the 1994 Asian Games
Basketball players at the 1998 Asian Games
Asian Games silver medalists for China
Asian Games bronze medalists for China
Medalists at the 1994 Asian Games
Medalists at the 1998 Asian Games